Gustav Muheim (11 September 1851 – 4 April 1917) was a Swiss politician and President of the Swiss Council of States (1890).

Further reading

External links 
 
 

1851 births
1917 deaths
Members of the Council of States (Switzerland)
Presidents of the Council of States (Switzerland)